Hai T. Pham is an American dentist and politician serving as a member of the Oregon House of Representatives for the 36th district. Elected in November 2022, he assumed office on January 9, 2023.

Early life and education 
Pham was born in Malaysia, the son of immigrants who fled Vietnam amid the Sino-Vietnamese War. He moved to Corvallis, Oregon, as a child. Pham earned a Bachelor of Science degree in biology from Oregon State University in 2002 and a Doctor of Medicine in Dentistry from the Oregon Health & Science University.

Career 
Outside of politics, Pham has worked as a dentist at Kaiser Permanente, Providence Health & Services, and the Randall Children's Hospital. He served as the president of the Washington County Dental Society and Oregon Academy of Pediatric Dentistry. From 2015 to 2019, Pham was a delegate of the American Dental Association. He served on the board of the Dentist Benefits Insurance Company, Pacific University, Oregon Board of Dentistry, and Dental Foundation of Oregon. Pham was elected to the Oregon House of Representatives in November 2022.

After Pham assumed office in January 2023, a complaint was filed with the Oregon secretary of state, alleging that Pham did not reside within the boundaries of his legislative district. The claim was not investigated.

References 

Living people
American politicians of Vietnamese descent
People from Washington County, Oregon
Oregon State University alumni
Oregon Health & Science University alumni
Oregon Health & Science University faculty
American dentists
Oregon Democrats
Members of the Oregon House of Representatives
People from Beaverton, Oregon
People from Corvallis, Oregon
People from Hillsboro, Oregon